Alfredo Capelli (5 August 1855 – 28 January 1910) was an Italian mathematician who discovered Capelli's identity.

Biography
Capelli earned his Laurea from the University of Rome in 1877 under Giuseppe Battaglini, and moved to the University of Pavia where he worked as an assistant for Felice Casorati. In 1881 he became the professor of Algebraic Analysis at the University of Palermo, replacing Cesare Arzelà who had recently moved to Bologna. In 1886, he moved again to the University of Naples, where he held the chair in algebra. He remained at Naples until his death in 1910. As well as being professor there, Capelli was editor of the Giornale di Matematiche di Battaglini from 1894 to 1910, and was elected to the Accademia dei Lincei.

Selected publications

References

External links

An Italian short biography of Alfredo Capelli in MATEpristem online.

19th-century Italian mathematicians
20th-century Italian mathematicians
1855 births
1910 deaths
Academic staff of the University of Palermo
Giornale di matematiche editors